The 1901–02 Ottawa Hockey Club season was the team's 17th season of play. After not challenging for the Stanley Cup after the previous season, no chance presented itself to Ottawa this season. The club finished second to Montreal in CAHL play. Montreal would play and defeat Winnipeg for the Cup.

Off-season 
The team held its annual meeting on December 5, 1901. The president was N.C. Sparks, the vice-president was L.N. Bate, and the secretary-treasurer was L.M. Butler. The team announced that it would play exhibitions in Pittsburgh and New York. The provisional roster included Bouse Hutton, Harvey Pulford, Charles Spittal, Frank McGee, Harry Westwick, Hod and Bruce Stuart, Peg Duval and Harold Henry. The trainer was Pete Green and the head coach was Alf Smith. Bruce Stuart returned for the season, after a season with Quebec, while his brother Hod returned to Quebec for the 1901–02 season. McGee would play for the Ottawa Aberdeens in the CAHL's intermediate division. Arthur Fraser played three games for Ottawa.

Regular season

Final Standing

Schedule and results

Exhibitions 
The Ottawa Hockey Club travelled to New York after the season for an exhibition series. Ottawa defeated the Hockey Club of New York 4–3 on March 21, 1902. Ottawa lost to the New York Athletic Club 6–3 on March 23. Both games were at the St. Nicholas Rink.

Player statistics

Scorers

Goaltending averages

Awards and records

Transactions

Roster 
 Bouse Hutton
 Aumond,
 Butterworth,
 Chambers,
 William Duval,
 Dave Gilmour,
 Harold Henry,
 Art Moore,
 Harvey Pulford,
 Charlie Spittal,
 Bruce Stuart,
 C. Watts,
 Harry Westwick

Source: Kitchen(2008), pp. 342–343

See also 
 1902 CAHL season

References 

 
 

Ottawa Senators (original) seasons
Ottawa